Samuel Suba is a South Sudanese politician. He was Commissioner of Lainya County, Central Equatoria.

References

Living people
County Commissioners of South Sudan
People from Central Equatoria
Year of birth missing (living people)